The 2021–22 Israeli Basketball Premier League, for sponsorship reasons Ligat Winner, was the 68th season of the Israeli Basketball Premier League. The league started on October 2, 2021.

Format
The regular season will be played in a 22-round Round-Robin format. The top 6 finishers will play the 5 rounds "upper house", with the other 6 teams playing the 5 rounds "bottom house".
The 6 upper group teams, joined by the top 2 teams from the bottom group, will play the quarter finals as Best-of-5 series. The semi finals and finals will be played as Best-of-3 series.

Teams

Ironi Nahariya and Maccabi Haifa have been relegated to 2021–22 National League after placing the bottom two places of the 2020–21 Premier League. Hapoel Galil Elyon and Elitzur Netanya have been promoted to the league after placing the top two places of the 2020–21 National League.

On August 4, 2021, Israeli Basketball Premier League administration informed Elitzur Netanya that she will not be able to participate in the coming season because its home hall does not meet the league's threshold conditions and construction has not yet begun for a new hall in the city. On August 17, the Supreme Court of the Basketball Association approved the agreements reached by Elitzur Netanya and the League administration in a mediation process, thus enabling Elitzur Netanya participation in the current season. Finally, the promotion of the group was not approved as it did not meet the threshold conditions of budgetary control.

Stadia and locations

Personnel and sponsorship

Managerial changes

Regular season

Rounds 1 to 22

Positions by round
The table lists the positions of teams after completion of each round. In order to preserve chronological evolvements, any postponed matches are not included in the round at which they were originally scheduled, but added to the full round they were played immediately afterwards.

Top-teams League Group

Positions by round

Bottom-Teams League Group

Positions by round

Playoffs

Brackets

Quarterfinals

Game 1

Game 2

Game 3

Game 4

Semifinals

Game 1

Game 2

Game 3

Finals

Awards

MVP of the Round

Monthly Awards

Player of the Month

Israeli Player of the Month

Coach of the Month

Yearly awards

Israeli clubs in European competitions

References

 
Israeli Basketball Premier League seasons
Israeli
Basketball